is a Japanese television jidaigeki or period drama, that was broadcast from 1979 to 1981. It is the 15th in the Hissatsu series. The drama was set to end after episode 26 with Nakamura Mondo's death, but won great popularity so the broadcast period was extended.

Plot
Nakamura Mondo was relegated to a post in Hachioji from the Minamimachi Bugyōsho and he has retired from professional assassin. But one day he was ordered to return to the Minamimachi Bugyōsho. Shikazō worked behind the scenes to get Mondo back to the Minamimachi Bugyōsho. Shikazō asks Nakamura Mondo to kill a man, once Mondo refuses but he is blinded by big money and eventually take the offer. Mondo restarts killing villains again with Kazarishokunin no Hide and Nawate Samon.

Cast
Makoto Fujita as Mondo Nakamura
Kunihiko Mitamura as Kazarishokunin no Hide, a craftsman but also professional assassin.
Goro Ibuki as Nawate Samon, a ronin.
Izumi Ayukawa as Kayo
Yuriko Mishima as Oshima
Takao Yamada as Hankichi
Isuzu Yamada as Otowa
Ganjirō Nakamura as Motojime Shikazō, the boss of Shigotonin team.
Kin Sugai as Sen Nakamura 
Mari Shiraki as Ritsu Nakamura

References

1979 Japanese television series debuts
1970s drama television series
Jidaigeki television series